Salang Tunnel fire may refer to:

1982 Salang Tunnel fire
2022 Salang Tunnel fire